Odyssey is a chain of bookstores in India, headquartered in Adyar, Chennai. Apart from books, the stores also sell music, movies, multimedia, stationery, toys and gifts. As of May 2010, Odyssey operates 56 stores across the country,  including in Bangalore, Calicut, Chennai, Coimbatore, Delhi, Ghaziabad, Hyderabad, Jaipur, Mumbai, Noida and Pune

History
Odyssey opened its first bookstore in Adyar, Chennai in 1995. Since then, the company has opened a number of outlets in more than a dozen cities across India, while the Adyar outlet itself has been relocated and expanded twice. The company's product range has also vastly expanded, although it claims that books remain its primary focus.

More recently, Odyssey has entered the areas of eyewear and luxury writing instruments with the launch of The Eyewear Store and Editions.

References

External links
 Official website
 Odyssey 360 - Online bookstore

Bookstores of India
Retail companies established in 1995
Companies based in Chennai
1995 establishments in Tamil Nadu
Indian companies established in 1995